Carlos Gutiérrez or Carlos Gutierrez may refer to:

Politicians
Carlos Gutiérrez (diplomat) (1818–1882), Honduran diplomat and writer
Carlos Gutierrez (born 1953), 35th United States Secretary of Commerce
Carlos Gutiérrez (born 1953), Argentine congressman
Carlos Gutiérrez Ruiz (born 1959), Mexican politician
, the assassinated president of the Federación Sindical de Trabajadores Mineros de Bolivia

Sportspeople

Association football
Carlos Gutiérrez (footballer, born 1939), Mexican footballer
Carlos Gutiérrez (Colombian footballer) (born 1972)
Carlos Gutiérrez (footballer, born 1976), Uruguayan footballer
Carlos Gutiérrez (footballer, born 1977), Mexican football manager and former midfielder
Carlos Gutiérrez Fajardo (born 1986), Honduran footballer
Carlos Gutiérrez (footballer, born 1990), Mexican football midfielder
Carlos Gutiérrez (Spanish footballer) (born 1991), Spanish footballer
Carlos Gutiérrez (footballer, born 1999) (born 1999), Mexican footballer

Other sports
Carlos Gutiérrez (baseball) (born 1986), American baseball player for the Chicago Cubs